Uthram Thirunal Marthanda Varma (26 September 1814 – 18 August 1860) was the Maharajah of Travancore state in southern India, succeeding his elder brother Maharajah Swathi Thirunal in 1846 till his demise in 1860. Known for his progressive rule, he abolished slavery in the kingdom. He was succeeded by his nephew Maharajah Ayilyam Thirunal in 1860. His mother was Her Highness Maharani Gowri Lakshmi Bayi. He was married to Thiruvattar Ammachi Panapillai Amma Srimathi Madhavi Pillai Kochamma of the Nagercoil Ammaveedu, who died in 1860, a few months before the Maharajah's death. The Maharajah's daughter was married by his nephew and heir Maharajah Ayilyam Thirunal.

The Maharajah also adopted Bharani Thirunal Lakshmi Bayi and Bharani Thirunal Parvathi Bayi from the related Kolathiri royal house in 1857 after the death of his niece to perpetuate the royal line.

See also
 Swathi Thirunal
 Travancore
 Gowri Lakshmi Bayi
 T Madhava Rao

Sources
 
 
 

1814 births
1860 deaths
Malayali people
Uthram
Hindu monarchs